No Man's Woman is a 1955 American noir crime film directed by Franklin Adreon and starring Marie Windsor, John Archer and Patric Knowles. The film's sets were designed by the art director Walter E. Keller.

Plot
Marie Windsor stars as Carolyn Ellenson Grant, a nasty selfish lady. Her husband is desperate to divorce her, but she refuses and lives a completely separate life on his money. She also has a lover who she uses ruthlessly to get what she wants and along the way she decides to destroy a few lives for kicks. Eventually, she is killed and the police think the husband did it...not realizing practically EVERYONE had motives to do it! Can the poor hubby manage to prove his innocence?

Cast
 Marie Windsor as Carolyn Ellenson Grant  
 John Archer as Harlow Grant  
 Patric Knowles as Wayne Vincent  
 Nancy Gates as Louise Nelson  
 Jil Jarmyn as Betty Allen  
 Richard Crane as Dick Sawyer  
 Fern Hall as Virginia Gillis  
 Louis Jean Heydt as Det. Lt. Colton  
 John Gallaudet as Det. Sgt. Wells  
 Douglas Wood as Philip Grant  
 Percy Helton as Otto Peterson  
 Morris Ankrum as Capt. Hostedder  
 Paul Bryar as Sandy 
 Morris Buchanan as Attendant  
 Ted Cooper as Photographer  
 Franklyn Farnum as Police Criminologist  
 Will J. White as Policeman

See also
List of American films of 1955

References

Bibliography
 Spicer, Andrew. Historical Dictionary of Film Noir. Scarecrow Press, 2010.

External links
 

1955 films
1955 crime films
American crime films
Films directed by Franklin Adreon
Republic Pictures films
1950s English-language films
1950s American films
American black-and-white films